Agromyces aurantiacus is a bacterium from the genus of Agromyces which has been isolated from primeval forest soil from Xishuangbanna in China.

References 

Microbacteriaceae
Bacteria described in 2003